Anthony Angello (born March 6, 1996) is an American professional ice hockey forward currently playing for the Milwaukee Admirals in the American Hockey League (AHL) while under contract to the Nashville Predators in the National Hockey League (NHL).

Early life
Angello was born on March 6, 1996, in Albany, New York to parents David and Pamela Angello. His family moved to Manlius when he was four and he was drawn to play hockey by his uncle, Jason Hover, who played hockey at Air Force Academy. Growing up, he played basketball, lacrosse, and hockey but committed to solely hockey as a freshman in high school.

Playing career
Angello attended Fayetteville-Manlius High School from 2011 to 2013 and played for both the Syracuse Jr. Stars and prep school team. He scored over 120 points in two high school seasons and was nearly a point-per-game producer for the Stars in his first year. In his sophomore season, Angello was selected by the Sault Ste. Marie Greyhounds in the 15th round of the 2012 Ontario Hockey League (OHL) Priority Draft. Despite his selection, Angello committed to play NCAA Division I ice hockey for the Cornell Big Red men's ice hockey team over opportunities at Harvard, Yale, and Colgate. He was also selected by the Omaha Lancers in the fifth round of the 2013 United States Hockey League (USHL) Entry Draft and participated in the USA Hockey Select 17 festival.

Angello played two seasons with the Lancers before being selected by the Pittsburgh Penguins in the fifth round, 145th overall, of the 2014 NHL Entry Draft. Angello played college hockey at Cornell University in the ECAC Hockey conference from 2015 to 2018. During the 2019–20 season, Angello made his NHL debut on January 31, 2020, in Pittsburgh's 4–3 overtime win over the Philadelphia Flyers. He later recorded his first career NHL goal and assist a few games later on February 18 in a 5–2 win over the Toronto Maple Leafs. Angello was not expected to play that night but was a last minute substitution for an ill Evgeni Malkin. He concluded his sophomore season with the Penguins organization recording 25 points in 48 games with their AHL affiliate and signed a two-year two-way contract extension worth $725,000 annually.

On July 14, 2022, Angello having left the Penguins as a free agent was signed to a one-year, two-way contract with the St. Louis Blues. Assigned to the Blues AHL affiliate, the Springfield Thunderbirds for the 2022–23 season, Angello in a third-line forward role added 6 goals and 11 points through 45 games. On March 8, 2023, Angello was traded by the Blues to the Nashville Predators in exchange for future considerations.

Career statistics

Awards and honors

References

External links

1996 births
Living people
American men's ice hockey forwards
Cornell Big Red men's ice hockey players
Sportspeople from Albany, New York
Ice hockey players from New York (state)
Milwaukee Admirals players
Omaha Lancers players
Pittsburgh Penguins draft picks
Pittsburgh Penguins players
Springfield Thunderbirds players
Wilkes-Barre/Scranton Penguins players